Vitellariopsis marginata is a species of plant in the family Sapotaceae. It is native to Mozambique, South Africa, and Eswatini.

References

marginata
Flora of Southern Africa
Plants described in 1895
Taxa named by André Aubréville
Taxa named by N. E. Brown